The women's 500 metres races of the 2016–17 ISU Speed Skating World Cup 1, arranged in the Heilongjiang Indoor Rink, in Harbin, China, were held on 11 and 13 November 2016.

Nao Kodaira of Japan won the first race, while Maki Tsuji of Japan came second, and Yu Jing of China came third. Arisa Go of Japan won the first Division B race.

Race 1
Race one took place on Friday, 11 November, with Division B scheduled in the morning session, at 11:45, and Division A scheduled in the afternoon session, at 16:00.

Division A

Note: NR = national record.

Division B

Race 2

Division A

Division B

References

2016–17 ISU Speed Skating World Cup
ISU